Alicante is a province of eastern Spain, in the southern part of the Valencian Community. It is the second most populated Valencian province. Likewise, the second and third biggest cities in the Valencian Community (Alicante and Elche, respectively) are located in this province.

Alicante is bordered by the provinces of Murcia on the southwest, Albacete on the west, Valencia on the north, and the Mediterranean Sea on the east. The province is named after its capital, the city of Alicante.

Territory, population and resources

According to the 2018 population data, Alicante ranks as the fourth most populous province in Spain (after Madrid, Barcelona and Valencia), with 1,838,819 inhabitants. Cities with more than 50,000 inhabitants in the province are Alicante (334,757 inhabitants), Elche (230,112), Torrevieja (101,792), Orihuela (86,164), Benidorm (71,034), Alcoy (61,552), Elda (55,168), and San Vicente del Raspeig (53,126).

The province has the largest ratio of foreigner population among all Spanish provinces. The total of 446,368 foreigners are registered in the province, which represents 23.6 percent of the total population.  Out of 141 municipalities that make up the province, foreign population is above 25% in 54 municipalities, and above 50% in 19 municipalities. The latter include San Fulgencio (80%), Rojales (74%), Benitatxell (69.8%), Algorfa (69.7%), Llíber (67%), Teulada (65.5%), Daya Vieja (64.4%); San Miguel de Salinas (64.3%), Calp (62.8%), Els Poblets (61.6%), Alcalalí (60.8%), Benijófar (58.5%), L'Alfàs del Pi (56.6%), Orba (55%), Xàbia (54%), Torrevieja (53.5%), Murla (52%), Fondó (51.7%), and Benidoleig (50%).

From the 50 provinces of Spain, Alicante is the only one with three metropolitan areas—Alicante–Elche, Elda–Petrer and Benidorm—even though only one of them (Alicante–Elche) is ranked within the Spanish top ten metropolitan areas.

Geography and climate

The province is mountainous, especially in the north and midwest, whereas it is mostly flat to the south, in the Vega Baja del Segura area; the most elevated points in the province are Aitana (1,558 m), Puig Campana (1,410 m), Montcabrer (1,389 m), Carrascar de la Font Roja (1,354 m), Maigmó (1,296 m), Serra de Crevillent (835 m) and El Montgó (753 m). All of these peaks are a part of the Subbaetic Range.

The coast extends from the cape, Cap de la Nau, in the north to almost reaching the Mar Menor (Minor Sea) in the south. With regard to water sources, due to the dry rain regime there are no major rivers, but mostly ramblas (dry rivers), which fill in with water when torrential rains occur.

The only remarkable streams are the Vinalopó, Serpis, and the river Segura. Other minor seasonal creeks (some completely dried out in summer) are Girona, Algar, Amadorio and Ebo.

There are saline wetlands and marshlands along the coast such El Fondo and the former wetlands and now salt evaporation ponds in Santa Pola and Torrevieja. All of them are key Ramsar Sites which make the Alicante province of high relevance for both migratory and resident seabirds and waterbirds.

Important coastal dunes are present in the Guardamar area which were planted with thousands of pine trees during the 19th century in order to protect the ville from the dunes advancing, which has created now an area of remarkable ecologic value.

The climate is strikingly diverse for such a reduced area. Three major areas can be cited:

 Most of the province belongs to a semi-arid climate. It roughly goes along the coastal plain from La Vila Joiosa through the southernmost border (cities included here are, amongst others, Alicante, Elche, Orihuela and Torrevieja). Summers are very long, hot to very hot and very dry, winters are cool to mild and its most prominent feature is very scarce precipitation, typically below 300mm. per year and most likely to happen during spring and autumn. The reasons for this lack of precipitation is mostly the marked rain shadow effect caused by hills to the west of the Alicante province (and, to a lesser degree, those in the northern part of the province which, in turn, enhance the inverse Orographic lift effect around Cap de la Nau). Most of its few rainy days happen during Autumn and Spring.

The predominant vegetation in this part of the province is Matorral Scrublands including thyme, esparto, juniper and the like.

Proper Mediterranean climate is present in the northeastern areas around Cap de la Nau, mostly to its North but also to its South, in diminishing grades until disappearing slightly north of Benidorm. It roughly goes along the coastal plain from the northern border of the province through the Benidorm area. The north slopes of the mountains in the Marina Alta have a remarkably wetter microclimate with an average of up to 900mm of precipitation due to orographic lift, with most of the precipitation occurring in Autumn and Spring. The precipitation in this area is an average four times the one of the semiarid South, with this big precipitation gap occurring in a matter of just .

The vegetation of this part is an enriched version of the Matorral shrubland and also Mediterranean pine woods.

The Alicante province also has a mostly dry Mediterranean to Continental Mediterranean climate. These are the innermost part of the province (for example Villena) and some closer to the sea but at a higher elevation (for example Alcoy). Here winters are cool to cold and a few days of snow are not unusual; summers are mild to hot and rains at about 500 mm average and slightly more evenly distributed through the year than in the previous mentioned areas. The innermost part of this domain is more quite dry while the mountainous part reach slightly higher precipitation figures which allow Kermes Oak woods to thrive, such as the one in La Carrasqueta or in the Mariola range, both near Alcoy.

History and politics

The Iberians were the oldest documented people living in what today is the Alicante province. Belonging to these there are several archaeologic sites from which is especially known the one in La Serreta (near Alcoy) because the longest inscriptions remaining in the undeciphered Iberian language were found there.

Along the coast and contemporarily to the Iberians, the seafaring Phoenicians (in Guardamar) and Greeks (along the coastal section to the north of the Alicante city) settled stable trading colonies and interacted with the former (see Lady of Elche for the most renowned archeological piece of this period).

After a brief Carthaginian period, the Romans took over. Romanization in this part of Iberia was intense, the Via Augusta communicated this part of the Empire to the metropoli and so several cities thrived, from which the one known as Ilici Augusta (now Elche) even reached the status of colonia.

After a brief period of Visigothic ruling, the area was taken by Islamic armies and became a part of Al Andalus.
From the 13th century, kings like Ferdinand III of Castile, James I of Aragon, Alfonso X of Castile, James II of Aragon reconquered the cities that Moors occupied. What today is the Alicante province was initially split between the Crown of Castile and the Crown of Aragon by means of the Treaty of Almizra, however later on the whole territory became under the control of the Kingdom of Valencia, which was a component Kingdom of the Crown of Aragon.

Alicante contributes with 12 deputies in the Spanish Parliament and with 36 deputies in the Corts Valencianes, the regional Parliament of the Valencian Community.

Economy

The main industries in Alicante province are, in the primary sector, intensive agriculture, especially in the fertile Vega Baja del Segura, Camp d'Elx (Elche's countryside) and vineyards in the inner part of the province (Monforte, Novelda, Pinós), also near the coast in the Marina Alta area. Fishing is important all along the coast, with important fishing harbours such as Santa Pola, Calp or Dénia.

Industry has been historically important in the textile sector around Alcoy. Footwear still remains as the flagship industrial sector of the province, which occurs in Elche, Elda, Petrer and Villena, both labour-intensive footwear and, specially, textile are at a low ebb due to harsh competition from fast pace growing economies in Asia. The traditionally important toys industry around the Ibi and Onil area is another one competing internationally with those same areas.

A sector which has gained preeminence during the last 20 years is marble quarrying and processing, it happens mostly in the Novelda and Pinós area.

Still, what the province is known for is its massive tourism sector. The Costa Blanca's generally mild and sunny weather attracts millions of tourists from other European countries such as the Netherlands, the UK and Ireland, Germany, Belgium, Norway or France and also from other parts in Spain like Madrid. Thousands of families from other places own a second home in the Alicante province which they use for their vacation time.

Gallery

Traditional subdivisions

Traditionally, Alicante province is divided into nine comarcas or comarques (in Valencian):
 Comtat: 28,391 inhabitants (2009); its capital is Cocentaina; textile industry and agriculture.
 Alcoià: It is subdivided into two clearly differentiated subcomarcas:
 Valls d'Alcoi or Valle de Alcoy: 69,224 inhabitants; its capital is  Alcoy; olive trees and textile industry; Moros y Cristianos festivals.
 La Foia de Castalla or Hoya de Castalla: 43,930 inhabitants; its capital is Castalla; its most populous city is Ibi; industry of toys.
 Marina Alta: 199,273 inhabitants; its capital is Dénia; it is the most rainy comarca; tourism.
 Marina Baixa or Marina Baja: 191,388 inhabitants; its capital is Benidorm; eminently tourist; beaches and mountains.
 Alto Vinalopó or Alt Vinalopó: 54,061 inhabitants; its capital is Villena; agriculture and footwear; Moros y Cristianos festivals.
 Vinalopó Mitjà or Vinalopó Medio: 173,324 inhabitants; its capital is Elda; footwear industry, marble, wines and grapes.
 Baix Vinalopó or Bajo Vinalopó: 290,481 inhabitants; its capital is Elche; agriculture, footwear and carpet industry, tourism; Misteri d'Elx (Elche's Mystery) festival and services with Alicante Airport in municipality of Elche.
 L'Alacantí: 476,123 inhabitants; its capital is Alicante; services and tourism; highly urbanised comarca; Bonfires of Saint John festival.
 Vega Baja del Segura or Baix Segura: 390,817 inhabitants; its capital is Orihuela; its most populous city is Torrevieja; agriculture and tourism.

Museums 
Alcoy:
 Archaeological Museum Camil Visedo
 Museu Alcoià de la Festa
 Firefighters Museum of Alcoy
 Shelter of Cervantes
Alicante:
 Alicante Museum of Contemporary Art
 Archaeological Museum of Alicante
 Gravina Museum of Fine Arts

Celebrations 
 Moors and Christians of Alcoy
 Bonfires of Saint John
 Mystery Play of Elche
 Moros y cristianos

See also
 List of municipalities in Alicante
 Alicante (Spanish Congress Electoral District)
 Suma Gestión Tributaria (Alicante Administration Body)
 Route of the Castles of Vinalopó

Notes

References

External links

 Excma. Diputación Provincial de Alicante